Laura Lansing Slept Here is a 1988 American made-for-television comedy film starring Katharine Hepburn and directed by George Schaefer which premiered on NBC on March 7, 1988. It was written by James Prideaux and co-stars Joel Higgins, Karen Austin, Brenda Forbes and Hepburn's grandniece Schuyler Grant.

Plot
Hepburn stars as Laura Lansing, a wealthy, world-famous pampered novelist who faces the crisis of her career when her publisher rejects her latest book. Faced with retirement, she makes a bet to prove that she has not lost touch with her readers: she will live with a middle-class family in the suburbs for seven days or give up writing forever. In the home of Walter and Melody Gomphers, Lansing turns the family's life upside down with her outlandish behavior. She struggles to relate to their children, meddles in the couple's marital matters and jeopardizes the conditions of her bet.

Cast
Katharine Hepburn as Laura Lansing
Karen Austin as Melody Gomphers
Brenda Forbes as Doris
Joel Higgins as Walter Gomphers
Lee Richardson as Larry Baumgartner
Nicolas Surovy as Conway
Schuyler Grant as Annette Gomphers

Reception
A reviewer from The New York Times noted that Hepburn essentially "played herself" in the movie, and that "it's to Katharine Hepburn's credit that she was able to make so much out of so little."

References

External links

1988 television films
1988 films
1988 comedy films
American comedy television films
NBC network original films
Films directed by George Schaefer
1980s English-language films
1980s American films